Fredro is a surname or given name. It may refer to:

 Aleksander Fredro (1793–1876), Polish poet, playwright, and writer
 Andrzej Maksymilian Fredro (1620–1679), Polish nobleman
 Fredro Starr, rapper

See also 

 Fredro (Bończa), Polish noble family of Bończa coat of arms